Marinette Dupain-Cheng is a fictional character and the female protagonist of the animated television series Miraculous: Tales of Ladybug & Cat Noir created by Thomas Astruc. Depicted as a teenage student of Chinese and French descent, she aspires to become a fashion designer and lives with her parents, Tom Dupain and Sabine Cheng, who own a bakery. After she passes the test of Master Fu, the keeper of the magical objects named the Miraculouses, by helping him, Marinette is chosen as a soon-to-be superheroine alongside Cat Noir. As a result, she is given a pair of earrings known as the Ladybug Miraculous, which when worn grants Marinette the ability to transform into Ladybug, her superheroine alias. Ladybug and Cat Noir's goal is to protect Paris from the villain Hawk Moth (French: Papillon) and defeat him altogether. Unknown to Marinette, Cat Noir's civilian identity is Adrien Agreste, a classmate whom she has feelings for. As the holder of a Miraculous, Marinette is assisted by a small red creature resembling a ladybug called Tikki, who is a magical being known as a kwami. As Ladybug, Marinette's signature ability is creation (through her Lucky Charm power). Marinette appears in most Miraculous media, including the main series, the mobile running game, and the comic books.

Marinette's character was inspired by a young woman wearing a ladybug-themed T-shirt who once worked with Astruc. After creating a drawing that portrayed her as a ladybug-themed superheroine, Astruc felt this would be a good character, especially as he was not aware of the existence of another ladybug-related superhero. The woman's haircut served as inspiration for Marinette's hairstyle as well. Marinette is voiced by Cristina Vee in the English dub, while Anouck Hautbois voices her in the French version of the series.

Marinette's character has received a generally positive critical response, with writers characterizing her as a role model for viewers and as a great protagonist; both her civilian self and her superheroine identity have been praised. Meet-and-greet sessions with Ladybug have taken place. Several pieces of merchandise based on her, such as accessories, clothing items, and action figures, have been created.

Development

Concept and creation 

The superheroine identity of Marinette Dupain-Cheng, Ladybug, was inspired by a young woman wearing a T-shirt with a ladybug depicted on it; she belonged to the production team of another show that also included Thomas Astruc, the creator of the animated television series Miraculous: Tales of Ladybug & Cat Noir. Astruc stated that he had befriended her, and following this they had started creating and "exchanging ladybug-themed sticky notes"; a note drawn by Astruc portrayed the woman as a ladybug-themed superhero. Astruc did not know of the existence of a ladybug-related superhero and felt this character would be good. As a result, Ladybug's character was conceptualized. Astruc thought that a superhero based on this idea had not previously been created because of not being sufficiently masculine. Marinette's hairstyle was also conceived using the woman's haircut as a model. Astruc said that Ladybug's power was connected to luck since ladybugs are associated with good luck. He commented that Ladybug's character is comparable to Spider-Man.

Astruc stated that while Marinette is a girl of action, this does not prevent her from wearing pink. He characterized Ladybug as an "awesome", special, very positive, and bright character. He also described her as his favorite character from the series. Astruc hoped that children would view Ladybug as a positive example, and that she would become the mascot of Paris, being found on flyers at museums' entrances to inspire children to visit them. In regard to Marinette and Adrien Agreste, he commented that he had wished to depict "sunny", inspiring characters. Astruc mentioned that Ladybug is one of the two most "powerful teenagers" alongside Cat Noir since she has the power of creation. He stated that handling the dynamics between Marinette's and Adrien's identities was entertaining. Astruc said that couples of superheroes like the one consisting of Ladybug and Cat Noir are uncommon in shows, and he felt that the viewers enjoy the love situation formed between the two of them. A source of inspiration for the duo of the ladybug and the black cat was one of Astruc's previous romantic relationships. Astruc stated that, as long there was a villain in the show, a romantic relationship between Marinette and Adrien would be able to happen only under certain circumstances and would need to be handled carefully, commenting that such a relationship would be brittle and complicated.

Ladybug's costume was difficult to animate when it came to the show's original 2D version since it was red with black dots; the dots had to be in certain places and had to remain unmoved. In the 3D version, this problem disappeared since there was a model moving. In the 2D version, Marinette was supposed to be older than she currently is in the 3D version. The chibi design of Ladybug from the series Miraculous Chibi was conceived by character designer Angie Nasca. The bakery of Marinette's family was inspired by a real-life Parisian bakery.

Astruc commented that deciding how Ladybug would use a certain item created with the help of her Miraculous to defeat the villain takes a quarter of the writers' working time for an episode; Sébastien Thibaudeau, the writing director of Miraculous, stated that Ladybug is intelligent since she manages to do what in reality several people can think of only when collaborating with each other. According to Thibaudeau, the writers wanted Marinette to not be based on clichés and to resemble a contemporary girl, able to create things and desiring to achieve something in life; they also wished Marinette's transformation into a self-assured superhero to show that people can change and become stronger. Marinette is also meant to highlight that one has to fight and be open-minded and smart in order to be successful in life. Thibaudeau said Marinette tries to improve Adrien's difficult life. Fred Lenoir, also writing for Miraculous, stated that Marinette's relationship with Adrien, both as civilians and as superheroes, is the main part of the show. Astruc mentioned that the third season of the series served as a test for Marinette; Mélanie Duval, another writer of Miraculous, commented that Marinette had a lot of obstacles to overcome in that season.

Jeremy Zag, the president of the animation studio Zagtoon, described Marinette as "a fresh and modern girl character who is in line with kids' and teens' lives today". The first two images depicting Ladybug released by Zag, one showing her portrait and one featuring her on a rooftop in Paris, received enough attention to surround the world. Zag said the love situation that Marinette created alongside Adrien, their superhero identities, and their secrets represent some of the main parts of the story. Jared Wolfson, the executive producer of Miraculous, stated that the audience of girls had been waiting for "someone like a Spider-Man to come along" and that, because of Ladybug's character, they can now transform into her, becoming "stronger" and making "an effect in the world". With regard to Ladybug's character, Aton Soumache, the chief executive officer of the company Method Animation, said the producers had wished to "create a [glamorous] superhero character with a real European flair with Paris as backdrop", as a result of the previous lack of an action series centered on a female superhero.

Nicole D'Andria, a contributor to the creation of a Miraculous comic book, said that Ladybug is an admirable character. ZAG America's president of global consumer products, André Lake Mayer, stated that children are fond of Ladybug's character, and that the fans would enjoy playing as Ladybug in the Miraculous mobile running game. She felt that Ladybug "is instantaneously empowering to all women, all ages", saying that she "is mesmerizing both as Marinette and as Ladybug". Mayer stated that "even without knowing the story", "she is instinctively familiar, authentic and strong", adding that "Ladybug is an icon for wholesome girl empowerment". She also characterized Ladybug as "relatable", and as "unique".

Voice 

Anouck Hautbois voices Marinette in the French version of the series. Thomas Astruc regarded Hautbois and the rest of the French cast as fantastic.

Cristina Vee voices Marinette in the English dub. Vee stated that she loves Marinette, describing her as one of her favorite characters that she voiced. She said Marinette reminds her of the character Sailor Moon, commenting that "working on the show" had given her "the same feelings" as the ones she had experienced while "watching Sailor Moon growing up as a kid". She stated that she had auditioned for Marinette's role considerably, most likely more than she had previously done for other characters. Vee said she had first obtained the script for the audition around a year before being cast, adding that she had not received a reply after auditioning. Following this, she had acquired the script once again, and after the audition, she received two callbacks. She stated that ever since she had seen Marinette's character design and the script, she had known that "whoever was cast as this character, Ladybug, would be the luckiest girl", precisely "the luckiest voice actress". After reading the script for the first time, Vee felt that Marinette was a version "on paper" of herself. Vee said she had fallen in love with Ladybug immediately. She commented that she had not been aware of this show's existence before auditioning for Marinette's role, which surprised her since she kept herself up to date with anime-related news. After auditioning and before receiving the callbacks, she found out about the anime promotional video of the series. After seeing the video, she started wanting the role all the more.

Vee said that she resembles Marinette very much, sometimes being "pretty shy and clumsy" and stumbling over her "words and feet". While she liked that Marinette is affectionate toward Adrien and "mixes up her words sometimes", Vee regarded "fighting crime as Ladybug" as "her favorite part" of voicing her, stating that she enjoyed the moments when Marinette says her specific phrases for her transformation into Ladybug and for using her signature superhero ability. She mentioned that Marinette and Adrien learning about each other's identities would be "exciting", adding that she wished to see how they would "work together in a different way to fight crime". Vee characterized this show as "amazing", stating that she had never seen an animation like this before and that "every episode is just so beautiful".

Many voice actors auditioned for the roles of the main characters, including Marinette's, when the casting for the series started. Ezra Weisz, the voice director of Miraculous, said that the staff in charge of the casting had wished Marinette to sound confident yet not excessively proud as a superhero, and they had wanted to find someone whose voice would be able to distinguish Marinette's civilian identity from her superhero self. Weisz mentioned that Vee does a remarkable job on voicing Marinette. He stated that Vee "has a young heroine quality to her voice", adding that he had always wished Vee "to be an actual superhero" since he felt she is a superhero "in real life". Weisz commented that Vee portrays the idea of a nervous teenager who becomes embarrassed around the person they love very well. He said that when Vee "transforms into Ladybug, she gets to put on her confidence", stating that this is precisely what she emanates in the vocal booth.

Jared Wolfson mentioned that Vee is energetic. He said she has a "beautiful personality", describing her as "so sweet", "so kind", and "great". He stated that in the recording studio, Vee "goes from sweet Marinette to Ladybug", adding that "she is Ladybug in that room" and that this is "so fun to watch".

Appearances

In the main series 
Marinette is the female protagonist of the Miraculous series. She is a 1.50 m tall, 14-year-old girl portrayed as a French-Chinese teenage student from Paris, who wishes to become a fashion designer. Marinette is the daughter of Tom Dupain and Sabine Cheng, granddaughter of Rolland and Gina Dupain, and grandniece of Wang Cheng. Her parents own a bakery. One day, when rushing toward school, Marinette notices an elderly man in danger and immediately saves him. While Marinette is not aware of this at the time, the man is Master Fu, the keeper of the magical objects called the Miraculouses, who has prepared a test in order to find someone deserving of becoming a superhero. Since Marinette has saved him, Master Fu decides to offer her the Ladybug Miraculous, which is a pair of earrings. After Marinette sees the box that contains the earrings and opens it, a creature resembling a ladybug who presents herself as Tikki appears; she is a magical being known as a kwami, who grants Marinette the power to transform into a superhero when wearing the earrings.

When she sees Tikki for the first time, Marinette is afraid of her. She is also not thrilled by the idea of becoming a superhero, and the first time she transforms is by mistake. Nevertheless, she learns how to act as a superhero shortly after that and introduces her superhero alias, Ladybug. Marinette's superhero outfit derives from Tikki's appearance, resembling a ladybug. Marinette is in love with Adrien, a boy from her class whom she gets nervous around. Unknown to Marinette, Adrien is actually her superhero partner, Cat Noir, who fancies Ladybug. Since Marinette is not aware of Cat Noir's civilian identity, she constantly rejects his advances toward her. Ladybug and Cat Noir's objective is to protect Paris from Hawk Moth, a man who has the ability to turn people into supervillains; he wishes to acquire Ladybug's and Cat Noir's Miraculouses, and, unknown to them, is actually Adrien's father. As Ladybug, Marinette becomes more sure of herself. The transformation into Ladybug offers her new abilities. Her signature power is creation, named "Lucky Charm". Ladybug's superhero weapon is a yo-yo.

Marinette has a loving relationship with her parents, and a close bond with Tikki. She also has a mainly positive relationship with her classmates, particularly with her best friend, Alya Césaire; Alya often offers support to Marinette and is there for her when she needs help, and she is a big fan of Ladybug. Marinette also has a close relationship with Luka Couffaine, the older brother of one of her classmates, and a friendly relationship with Nino Lahiffe, who once had a crush on her. At the same time, Marinette does not get along with Chloé Bourgeois, nor with Lila Rossi, due to their constant bullying and verbal abuse they put on her.

In other Miraculous media 
Besides the main series, Marinette appears in most Miraculous media. She is present in the Christmas special episode, which consists of a musical format. Marinette appears in the special episode set in New York City, and she is also present in the special episode that takes place in Shanghai. She has been featured in the chibi episodes, in the Tales from Paris episodes, and in the Miraculous Secrets episodes. Marinette has appeared in several sequences where she has addressed to the viewers in a direct way, and in a live session sustained on the YouTube account of Disney Channel. She has been part of a video clip promoting proper hygiene among children. Marinette is a playable character in the Miraculous mobile running game. She appears in comic books inspired by the series; she is present in other types of books based on the show as well. Marinette is pictured in the official Miraculous magazine. She will appear in a Miraculous musical film titled Ladybug & Cat Noir Awakening, and in a 2D OVA. Marinette is also depicted in live stage shows, including during a tour.

Reception

Critical response 
Critical reception of Marinette has been generally positive, with writers describing her as a famous character, and as "pretty", charismatic, clever, sweet, and inventive. Emily Ashby of Common Sense Media characterized Marinette as "patient" and "kind". ComicsVerse writer Michele Kirichanskaya felt that the series "takes the time to address Marinette's heritage" in "a subtle and respectful manner", citing the "moments when she struggles with speaking Chinese" and has "cultural miscommunications with relatives". Kirichanskaya wrote that Marinette's complete name when "translated from both Chinese and French languages" is "appropriate for a girl whose family owns a bakery". She described Marinette as "loyal and devoted to her friends and family". Kirichanskaya said Marinette being "an aspiring fashion designer" who makes "new creations in her spare time" shows that "feminine interests [do not] necessarily detract from superheroic qualities", deeming this "a positive message for male and female viewers alike". She thought that the feelings Marinette has for Adrien "only define one aspect of her character". Caroline Gourdin of La Libre Belgique stated that Marinette's character is one of the main aspects of the series, adding that she can appeal to both girls and boys. Nerd Much? writer Emily Auten felt that "Marinette's shoujo-like crush on Adrien" is one of the "small aspects that anime fans can appreciate" in this show. Auten wrote that "Marinette takes center stage" as a protagonist despite the lack of heroines in television series; she also stated that "Marinette is a great female protagonist". Auten said Marinette is "very well-written", stating that she is "a great role model" for both children and adults "to look up to and relate with". She praised Cristina Vee's role as Marinette's voice actress. An El Intransigente writer said that the applauded protagonist of this series is a girl, unlike how it happens in other shows, and that Marinette has a big heart. Marinette was commented to have "innocent optimism". She was described as a very important character for children from many countries, including France.

Marinette's superhero form, Ladybug, has been commended. Elle Collins of ComicsAlliance said the way "Marinette transforms into Ladybug in a series of twirls and poses" resembles how "Sailor Moon and other magical girls always do". She felt that Marinette having "the guidance of some kind of talking ladybug creature" completes "another Magical Girl trope". Los Angeles Times writer Robert Lloyd commented that Marinette is a "smart girl" and characterized her superhero form as "a costumed crusader". Michele Kirichanskaya stated that while Marinette initially "appears to be just an ordinary girl", with the help of "a pair of magical earrings" she "can transform into the Miraculous Ladybug, one of Paris's greatest superheroes". She described Marinette as "a bright, talented, creative young woman, trying to balance her daily life with all the responsibilities that entail being France's greatest superheroine". Kirichanskaya characterized Ladybug as "an incredible hero" who is "fluid and confident in battle". She felt that "Marinette embodies the most" of both her ordinary and superhero lives "in a beautiful force of a character". Laura Aasland of Culture Honey praised that while Ladybug keeps "groaning at Cat Noir's puns", Marinette has feelings for Adrien. Ella Anders of BSCkids said that while "from a glance [Marinette] appears to be a typical high-school teen", she is "a champion of right" in reality. Epicstreams Caitlin Donovan described Marinette as "an adorable lead who is genuinely awkward as a civilian" yet "confident as a superhero", feeling this "makes for an interesting contrast". Best Movie writer Irene Rosignoli commended Marinette's ability to transform from her shy civilian self into a courageous, confident, and resolute superhero, viewing it as a constructive message for girls throughout the world. Ladybug was characterized as an amazing superhero who can immediately impress the young viewers, and she was deemed capable, brave, and girls' favorite superhero.

Popularity and merchandise 
Bandai's brand management vice president, Kenji Washida, described Marinette as "a quirky but lovable girl growing up, going to school and having first crushes", stating that she is a character "girls can relate to"; he said Marinette's superhero alter ego is "someone they want to be". Washida viewed "the concept of a young girl as a superhero" as "a game-changer in both toys and entertainment". Guess's chief creative officer and chairman, Paul Marciano, praised Marinette's secret identity and her relationship with Adrien. The licensing director of Gemma International, Tim Rudd-Clarke, characterized Ladybug as "a strong and empowered female superhero" who "fills a huge gap in the market that has been vacant for quite some time". The PGS Entertainment staff described Marinette as a female "lead superhero" who "instills positive values". A life-size wax statue depicting Ladybug has been showcased at the Musée Grévin. A Snapchat filter inspired by her has been created. Ladybug has been portrayed on buses. Indoor playgrounds based on Ladybug and Cat Noir have been built. Meet-and-greets containing Ladybug have been arranged, including at a theme park. She has served as inspiration for a Christmas event, and for face painting. Cosplays of her have been made.

Several pieces of merchandise inspired by Marinette's civilian and superhero identities have been created, including action figures, clothing items, accessories, masks, and stickers. Figurines portraying Ladybug have been developed by Funko, and by Burger King. Toys based on her have been produced, such as Kinder Surprise toys, and a toy telephone. Pez candy dispensers inspired by her have been launched. A game based on Ladybug and other Miraculous characters has been released. Beach-related items depicting Ladybug have been produced, and school-related items portraying her have also been invented. Sweets inspired by her have been created. Other products based on her, including bedclothes, have also been developed.

See also
 Chinese community in Paris

References

Further reading

External links 
 Characters section on the official website
 Official Japanese character page of Marinette Dupain-Cheng
 Official Japanese character page of Ladybug

Animated characters introduced in 2015
Animated human characters
Child characters in animated television series
Child superheroes
Chinese superheroes
Female characters in animated series
Female superheroes
Fictional Chinese diaspora
Fictional Eurasian people
Fictional flexible weapons practitioners
Fictional middle school students
Fictional people from Paris
Fictional traceurs and freerunners
Fictional women soldiers and warriors
French superheroes
Magical girl characters
Miraculous: Tales of Ladybug & Cat Noir characters
Superheroes with alter egos
Teenage characters in television
Television characters introduced in 2015
Television superheroes